Big Bunsby Marine Provincial Park is a provincial park on the west coast of northern Vancouver Island in British Columbia, Canada, to the southeast of the Brooks Peninsula in Checleset Bay. It is accessible only by boat.

The park is a good spot for viewing gray whales, bald eagles and sea otters.

References

External links
Big Bunsby Marine Provincial Park at BC Parks

Provincial parks of British Columbia
Kyuquot Sound region
Year of establishment missing
Marine parks of Canada